Océano Club de Kerkennah (often referred to as OCK or mainly ) is a Tunisian football team from the archipelago of Kerkennah. The club was founded in 1963. They play in blue and white colors.

OCK also has small volleyball, kung-fu, judo and swimming sections, and formerly had handball, basketball and pétanque sections.

History
In October 1964 OCK played for the first time in the third division. They were successful and placed first at the end of the season, going undefeated with 7 wins, one draw and no losses. But in the final playoff match for promotion to the Second Division OCK were defeated by Club Olympique de Médenine.

In 1969 a handball and a pétanque section were founded. These sections of the sports club are now defunct.

After five years in the Regional League III (region of Sfax), where they won the regional championship each time but failed the playoffs, the club eventually joined the second division in 1970 to spend nine years before joining the elite in the 1978–79 season. OCK spent 13 seasons in the first division (professional level). Known for their ultra-defensive playing style, they clung on for five years but eventually were relegated. During the 1990s, considered by many to be the glory years of the club, OCK "clung like an octopus" (as said by other first division clubs).

In the 1990–91 season, OCK was promoted to the first division. In 1991–92, the club had the largest budget in its history and the 6th largest of all first division clubs, after Espérance Sportive de Tunis, Club Africain, Étoile Sportive du Sahel, Club Sportif Sfaxien and Stade Tunisien with 645 000 00 Tunisian Dinar.

A year later, they came back with a new style that often led them to great success. After mixed fortunes, the club were relegated from the first division for the last time in 1997 to the second division. After two seasons (1997–98 and 1998–99) in the second division, they were relegated again. Since the 1999–2000 season OCK have played in the third division, where they been fighting for survival for a number of years. With constant coach changes, the club has struggled to achieve the consistency required for promotion back to League division II.

In the 2009–10 season, OCK was very close to going back to Tunisian League division II halfway through the season. But after a bad second half of the season, they after a good first half of the season. But after a bad second half, they finished only 6th in the division III table. This season was the first season after their comeback last season in which OCK played entirely at the Farhat Hached Stadium in Remla, Kerkennah.

Strip

Stadiums in Sfax
OCK has played in the City El Habib Stadium in recent years, and occasionally also plays in the 2 Mars Stadium in Sfax.

Important games (against professional teams) are played in the Stade Taïeb Mhiri of Sfax.

Stadium Farhat Hached in Kerkennah
In 2001–02, OCK played its first season at Farhat Hached Stadium in Remla, Kerkennah. But after many security  problems, the team had to stop playing there and went back to the stadiums of Sfax.

During the 2008–09 season, OCK moved back to the modernised Farhat Hached Stadium. The stadium was modernised with a new security force, new third generation grass, new floodlights and new player banks. The inauguration game of the new stadium on 15 March 2009 was won by OCK against Club Olympique de Médenine, 2–1.

Before OCK played in Farhat Hached Stadium, it was mainly used by the second football team of Kerkennah, Kerkennah Sports (KS).

Supporters
L`Association Supporters OCK was the first supporter group of OCK. This group founded in the 1990s, when OCK was enjoying its greatest success, participating in Ligue 1.

Achievements

It is at the amateur levels of Tunisian football that OCK have obtained their greatest achievements:
 Tunisian Ligue Professionnelle 2: 4
1990–91
Winner of (South Pole) : 1977–78, 1984–85, 1995–96
 League cup of Amateurs: (2)
2004–05 2005–06
Semi-Finalist – 2006–07
 Fair Play Cup Tunisian Ligue Professionnelle 1 : 1
1991–92
 Fair Play Cup Tunisian Ligue Professionnelle 2 : 1
1990–91
 Espoirs Cup (U 21): 1
1987–88
 Cadets A Cup: 1
1995–96

Tunisian Presidents Cup
 Semi-Finals: 1
1991–92 – OCK 0–1 Stade Tunisien

 Quarter-Finals: 5
1982–83 – Stade Tunisien 3–0 OCK
1989–90 – Stade Tunisien 1–0 OCK
1991–92 – OCK 1–0 Club Athlétique Bizertin
2005–06 – OCK 0–1 Club Africain
2006–07 – OCK 2–3 (aet) Club Athlétique Bizertin

 Second round: 1
2004–05 OCK 0–2 Club Athlétique Bizertin

Championship of Tunisia

OCK has played on many occasions against the largest and most important teams in Tunisian football. Their playing record against these teams is as follows:

Sfax derbies
All OCK games against Club Sportif Sfaxien, Sfax Railways Sports, Stade Sportif Sfaxien and Club Ahly Sfaxien are considered derbies of the Sfax region. Because Kerkennah is an archipelago of Sfax, there is a big rivalry between these teams. Another major rivalry was between OCK and Club Sportif Sfaxien during the 1990s (the glory years of OCK).

Island derbies
The games of OCK against Espoir Sportif de Jerba Midoun, AS Djerba (Houmt Souk) and Union Sportive d`Ajim are the only games between two islands in Tunisian football, because the other two smaller islands of Tunisia are not represented by teams in the national football competition.

Kerkennah Derby
OCK also takes part in the "Kerkennah Derby" against Kerkennah Sports (KS), but mainly on friendly level. There is a good atmosphere between the two clubs and no rivalry.

Former personnel

Presidents

 Rachid Kraiem
 Abdelmajid Yangui
 Mohamed Cheour
 Mohamed Kraiem (1976–80)
 Ali Attaya (1980–84)
 Mohamed Jomaa (1984–87)
 Mokhtar Hmani (1987–89)
 Abdelmajid Kacem (1989–90)
 Abdeljelil Arous (1990–92)
 Jamel Toumi (1992–94)
 Hamed Sallem (1994–95)
 Mohamed Larbi (1995–96)
 Abdeljelil Arous (1996–98)
 Fethi Arous (1998–00)
 Mohamed Larbi (2000–03)
 Mohamed Bayoudhi (2003–04)
 Mohamed Hmani (2004–05)
 Ali Cheour (2005–)

Coaches

 Mohamed Toumi (1964–66)
 Mohamed Najjar (1966–67)
 Mekki Jerbi (1967–70)
 Noureddine Ben Mahmoud (1970–73)
 Ahmed Ouannes (1973–75)
 Mongi Delhoum (1975–79)
 Moncef Melliti (1979–81)
 Mongi Delhoum (1981–83)
 Moncef Melliti (1983–84)
 Guyrov (1984–85)
 Ahmed Aleya (1985)
 Youssef Baathi (1985–86)
 Rachid Daoud (1986)
 Hmida Sellam (1986)
 Moncef Barka (1987)
 Rado Radocijik (1987–88)
 Moncef Melliti (1988)
 Zoninski (1988–89)
 Mongi Delhoum (1989–90)
 Riadh Charfi and Farhat Dahech (1990–92)
 Farhat Dahech and Youssef Baathi (1992–93)
 Farhat Dahech and Ahmed Fersi (1993–94)
 Riadh Charfi (1994)
 Jamaleddine Bouabsa (1995)
 Moncef Melliti (1995–96)
 Jamil Kacem and Youssef Baathi (1996–97)
 Moncef Melliti (1997)
 Hédi Kouni (1998)
 Oussama Melliti (1998)
 Jamil Kacem (1998)
 Samir Grayaa (1999)
 Youssef Baathi (1999)
 Hassouna Belghith (1999–00)
 Moncef Melliti (2000)
 Samir Grayaa (2000–01)
 Chiheb Ellili (2001–03)
 Adel Larguech (2003)
 Samir Grayaa (2004)
 Jamil Kacem (2004–06)
 Riadh Charfi (2006)
 Hamadi Barkia (2007)
 Fakher Trigui (2007)
 Nader Werda (2007)
 Mongi Ketata (2008)
 Zouhir Arous, Mansour Lerguech. Abdelfatah Leghribi (2008)
 Zouhir Arous, Mabrouk Kaanich (co-coaches) (2008–)

Notes

External links
 Official website

Association football clubs established in 1963
Football clubs in Tunisia
1963 establishments in Tunisia
Sports clubs in Tunisia